Cégep de Baie-Comeau is a CEGEP in Baie-Comeau, Quebec, Canada. Cégep de Baie-Comeau, a pre-university and technical college, is affiliated with ACCC, and CCAA.

Mission
The mission of Baie-Comeau Cégep is to provide students diversified, high quality training in higher education, to engage in research and to contribute to social, cultural and economic development. The vision is to be recognized as a leader in economic development, social and cultural development in support of their mission and expertise.

History
The college traces its origins to the merger of several institutions which became public ones in 1967, when the Québec system of CÉGEPs was created.

Programs
The Province of Quebec awards a Diploma of Collegial Studies for two types of programs: two years of pre-university studies or three years of vocational (technical) studies. The pre-university programs, which take two years to complete, cover the subject matters which roughly correspond to the additional year of high school given elsewhere in Canada in preparation for a chosen field in university. The technical programs, which take three-years to complete, applies to students who wish to pursue a skill trade. In addition Continuing education and services to business are provided.

See also
Higher education in Quebec

References

External links
Cégep de Baie-Comeau Website 

Buildings and structures in Baie-Comeau
Baie-Comeau
Buildings and structures in Côte-Nord
Education in Côte-Nord
Colleges in Quebec